Perlberg is a surname. Notable people with the surname include:

Jana Perlberg (born 1966), German judoka
William Perlberg (1900–1968), American film producer

Jewish surnames